César David Izturis (born February 10, 1980) is a Venezuelan former professional baseball shortstop. He is the half-brother of shortstop Maicer Izturis.

Career

Toronto Blue Jays
Signed by the Toronto Blue Jays as an amateur free agent in 1996, Izturis made his debut with Toronto in 2001 and was traded to the Los Angeles Dodgers at the end of the season.

Coming from a long tradition of Venezuelan shortstops, which includes Chico Carrasquel, Luis Aparicio, Dave Concepción, Ozzie Guillén, Omar Vizquel, Álex González and Carlos Guillén, Izturis has the defensive skills to rank in such distinguished company. After showing some hitting potential with a .269 average in his rookie season with Toronto, the Dodgers were enthusiastic to trade for him.

Los Angeles Dodgers
Izturis was designated as the everyday starting shortstop from Opening Day of the 2002 season, and he quickly established himself in the Dodgers' infield. But he showed no patience at the plate, resulting in a decline in average and very few walks. After two years of barely adequate hitting (though compensated by his stellar glovework), he improved markedly in 2004, when he hit .288 with 62 RBI and 25 stolen bases in 159 games. At the end of the season, he earned his first Gold Glove, the first by a Dodger shortstop since Maury Wills' back-to-back honors in 1961 and 1962.

In 2005, Izturis hit .348 through June 1 and led the entire majors in hits. He was selected for the National League All-Star team, but his batting average later dipped all the way down into the .250 range. Curiously, his defense also seemed to suffer. After two trips to the disabled list, Izturis underwent Tommy John surgery in his right elbow, and returned in mid-June, 2006.

With the uncertainty around Izturis, the Dodgers acquired shortstop Rafael Furcal in the off-season. That move seemed to have put Izturis' future with the Dodgers in doubt. With a $13 million annual salary, Furcal did not seem a likely candidate to be benched.

Chicago Cubs/Pittsburgh Pirates/St. Louis Cardinals
At the 2006 trade deadline, Izturis was traded to the Chicago Cubs for Greg Maddux and cash considerations.

On July 19, 2007, Izturis and cash were traded to the Pittsburgh Pirates for a player to be named later.

On November 16, 2007, the Pirates declined an option on Izturis, and he became a free agent. Shortly thereafter on November 30, 2007, Izturis signed a one-year, $2.85 million deal with the St. Louis Cardinals.

Baltimore Orioles
On December 16, 2008, Izturis signed a two-year deal with the Baltimore Orioles

In 2009, he led all starting shortstops in range factor, at 4.89.

On December 10, 2010, Izturis re-signed with the Baltimore Orioles to a 1-year contract.

Milwaukee Brewers
On December 21, 2011 he signed a minor league contract with the Milwaukee Brewers. He also received an invitation to spring training. On March 29, 2012, Izturis was added to the Major League 25-man roster by the Brewers.

Washington Nationals
On August 6, 2012, the Washington Nationals claimed Izturis off waivers from the Brewers. He was designated for assignment by the Washington Nationals on August 17, only 11 days after arriving in Washington. On August 20, 2012, he was granted free agency.

Cincinnati Reds
On January 14, 2013, the Cincinnati Reds announced that they had signed Izturis to a minor league contract with an invitation to major league spring training. The Reds selected the contract of Izturis on March 31.

Houston Astros
Izturis signed a minor league deal with the Houston Astros on January 14, 2014. He was released on March 24.

Personal life
Izturis resides in Barquisimeto, Venezuela, with his wife Liliana and their two children; his son Cesar Daniel (born November 11, 1999) and daughter Daniella (born July 17, 2006). In 2016, Cesar Daniel signed with the Seattle Mariners as an international free agent.

See also

 List of Gold Glove Award winners at shortstop
 List of Major League Baseball players from Venezuela

References

External links

, or Retrosheet
Article Baseball Library 
Venezuelan Professional Baseball League statistics

1980 births
Baltimore Orioles players
Bowie Baysox players
Cardenales de Lara players
Chicago Cubs players
Cincinnati Reds players
Dunedin Blue Jays players
Gold Glove Award winners
Gulf Coast Orioles players
Hagerstown Suns players
Las Vegas 51s players
Living people
Los Angeles Dodgers players
Major League Baseball players from Venezuela
Major League Baseball shortstops
Milwaukee Brewers players
Nashville Sounds players
National League All-Stars
Sportspeople from Barquisimeto
Pittsburgh Pirates players
St. Catharines Stompers players
St. Louis Cardinals players
Syracuse SkyChiefs players
Toronto Blue Jays players
Venezuelan expatriate baseball players in Canada
Venezuelan expatriate baseball players in the United States
Washington Nationals players
World Baseball Classic players of Venezuela
2009 World Baseball Classic players